The 2017–18 Princeton Tigers men's basketball team represented Princeton University during the 2017–18 NCAA Division I men's basketball season. The Tigers, led by seventh-year head coach Mitch Henderson, played their home games at Jadwin Gymnasium as members of the Ivy League. They finished the season 13–16, 5–9 in Ivy League play to finish in a tie for fifth place and failed to qualify for the Ivy League tournament.

Previous season
The Tigers finished the 2016–17 season 23–7, 14–0 in Ivy League play to win the Ivy League regular season championship. They defeated Penn and Yale to win the inaugural Ivy League tournament championship. As a result, they earned the conference's automatic bid to the NCAA tournament as the No. 12 seed in the West Region. There they lost in the First Round to #5 seed Notre Dame.

Offseason

Departures

2017 recruiting class

2018 recruiting class

Roster

Schedule and results

|-
!colspan=8 style=| Regular season

References

See also
 2017–18 Princeton Tigers women's basketball team

Princeton Tigers men's basketball seasons
Princeton
Princeton Tigers men's basketball
Princeton Tigers men's basketball